Einar Gundersen (25 September 1915 – 12 May 1997) was a Norwegian footballer. He played in five matches for the Norway national football team from 1939 to 1948.

References

External links
 

1915 births
1997 deaths
Norwegian footballers
Norway international footballers
Place of birth missing
Association footballers not categorized by position